Tangewala is a 1972 Bollywood action film directed by Naresh Kumar. The film stars Rajendra Kumar and Mumtaz

Plot
Zamindar Thakur played by (Sujit Kumar) is an arrogant, alcoholic, womanizer. His Munimji (Kanhaiyalal) procure women for him frequently. In order to get even with Raju (Rajendra Kumar), Zamindar asks his munim to get Raju's sister, Gauri (Kumud Chhugani). Thakur and Gauri meet, and has slowly Gauri trusting him, then he marries her in an isolated temple with the munim posing as a priest. Gauri gets pregnant, and she and Rajoo go to the Thakur so that he can marry her, but Thakur denies ever knowing her, leave alone marrying her, and Munimji supports the Thakur. Gauri and family are devastated and leave the village. Gauri gives birth to a baby boy, and Raju arranges for Gauri to remarry, however, on the day of the marriage she runs away. Raju's love life with Paro (Mumtaz) has been on hold, and Raju's mom is awaiting the return of her husband, so with Gauri running away they have to now re-locate again. Raju returns to the village to avenge his sister, instead he is arrested by the police and jailed, leaving his mother, nephew, and Gauri to fend for themselves.

Cast
Rajendra Kumar as Rai Bahadur Kishandas / Raju / Dilbahadur Khan
Mumtaz
Sujit Kumar as Zamindar 
Bhagwan   
Mohan Choti   
Kumud Chuggani as Gauri 
I. S. Johar as Nagina 
Kanhaiyalal as Munimji / Panditji 
Kamini Kaushal as Laxmi 
Mehmood Jr.   
Leela Mishra as Mausi 
Paintal   
Jagdish Raj as Police Inspector

Songs
All songs were composed by Naushad and written by Majrooh Sultanpuri.

1. "Jawani Bar Bar Nahi Aaye" - Lata Mangeshkar
2. "Do Diwane Aaye" - Mohammed Rafi & Asha Bhosle
3. "Thap Thup Thip Ki Taal Pe Mera" - Mohammed Rafi
4. "Kar Bhala Hoga Bhala" - Mukesh
5. "Aisa Phanda Mare Gori" - Mohammed Rafi & Asha Bhosle
6. "Aayi Re Khilone Waku Aayi" - Lata Mangeshkar

External links
 

1972 films
1970s Hindi-language films
1972 action films
Indian action films
Hindi-language action films
Films scored by Naushad